Middle East Technical University Northern Cyprus Campus (METU NCC) (Turkish: Orta Doğu Teknik Üniversitesi Kuzey Kıbrıs Kampüsü, ODTÜ KKK) was established as a result of an invitation conveyed to METU in the year 2000 by the Governments of Republic of Turkey and Turkish Republic of Northern Cyprus. It is a major higher education project financed by the Republic of Turkey and serves both Turkish and international students. METU NCC enjoys full academic and administrative support of METU in Ankara.

METU NCC offers internationally accepted degree programs in engineering and social sciences. The language of instruction on the Campus is English.

METU Northern Cyprus Campus admitted students to one undergraduate program in 2003-2004, and to six undergraduate programs in 2004–2005. These students spent their initial years on METU Ankara Campus and have moved to METU Northern Cyprus Campus at the beginning of 2005–2006 academic year. In the 2013–2014 academic year, METU NCC offered 15 undergraduate programs and 3 graduate programs to about 2200 students. As of 2020–2021 academic year, METU NCC is offering 14 undergraduate programs, 5 graduate programs and also 12 minor programs.

METU Northern Cyprus Campus is attached to the main campus in Ankara in all academic and administrative affairs. All degree programs of METU NCC are approved by the METU Senate, and provide the same quality standards of the main campus in Ankara. The METU NCC academic staff are recruited and promoted in accordance with the same criteria set forth by METU Senate and Administrative Board. The graduates of METU NCC are entitled to receive internationally recognized METU diploma.

METU Northern Cyprus Campus is built on an area of 339 hectares (137 acres), approximately 50 km west of Lefkosa (Nicosia) and 6 km north of Guzelyurt (Morphou), a town with a population of 12,000. Today, METU NCC's features include the Cultural and Convention Center, Administration - Library - IT Center Complex, Cafeteria, Shopping Center, Student Association Rooms, Dormitories, Staff Housing, Fitness-Wellness Club, Post Office, Book Store, Health & Counseling Center, Sports Complex, and an outdoor swimming pool. The Campus is designed with the necessary provisions to accommodate physically handicapped students.

References

Universities in Northern Cyprus
Education in Northern Cyprus
Educational organisations based in Northern Cyprus
Educational institutions established in 2003
2003 establishments in Northern Cyprus